Kevin Delaney Kline (born October 24, 1947) is an American actor. He is the recipient of an Academy Award and three Tony Awards. In addition, he has received nominations for two British Academy Film Awards,  two Primetime Emmy Awards, and five Golden Globe Awards. In 2003, Kline was inducted into the American Theatre Hall of Fame.

Kline began his career on stage in 1972 with The Acting Company. He has gone on to win three Tony Awards for his work on Broadway, winning Best Featured Actor in a Musical for the 1978 original production of On the Twentieth Century, Best Actor in a Musical for the 1981 revival of The Pirates of Penzance. In 2003, he starred as Falstaff in the Broadway production of Henry IV, for which he won the Drama Desk Award for Outstanding Actor in a Play. In 2017 he won the Tony Award for Best Actor in a Play for the revival of Noël Coward's Present Laughter.

He made his film debut in romantic drama Sophie's Choice (1982). For his role in the comedy A Fish Called Wanda (1988), Kline won the Academy Award for Best Supporting Actor. His other films include The Big Chill (1983), Silverado (1985), Cry Freedom (1987), Grand Canyon (1991), Dave (1993), French Kiss (1995), The Ice Storm (1997), In & Out (1997), Wild Wild West (1999), Life as a House (2001), De-Lovely (2004), The Conspirator (2010), My Old Lady (2014), and Beauty and the Beast (2017). Kline has voiced characters in the films The Hunchback of Notre Dame (1996), The Road to El Dorado (2000), The Tale of Despereaux (2008), and the animated comedy series Bob's Burgers (2011–present), for which he has earned a Primetime Emmy nomination. He has reprised his role in the latter's theatrical feature The Bob's Burgers Movie (2022).

Early life and education 
Kline was born on October 24, 1947, in St. Louis, Missouri, to Margaret Agnes Kirk and Robert Joseph Kline (1909–1996).<ref
name="Robert"/> His father was a classical music lover and an amateur opera singer who owned and operated The Record Bar, a record store in St. Louis that opened in the early 1940s, and also sold toys during the 1960s and 1970s; his father's family also owned Kline's Inc., a department store chain. Kline has described his mother as the "dramatic theatrical character in our family". Kline's father was Jewish, while his mother was Catholic. Kline was raised in his mother's Catholic faith. He has an older sister, Kate, and two younger brothers, Alexander and Christopher.

He graduated from the Saint Louis Priory School in 1965. In 1997, the school named its new auditorium as the Kevin Kline Theater in his honor. Kline performed selections from Shakespeare as a benefit at the dedication.

He attended Indiana University, Bloomington, where he was a classmate of actor Jonathan Banks. He began studying composing and conducting music, but switched to a theater and speech major for his last two years, graduating in 1970. Kline remembers: "When I switched to the Theater Department, all I did was theater...I could barely make it to class because this was my passion." While an undergraduate, he was a co-founder of the Vest Pocket Players, an off-campus theatrical troupe.

Acting career

In 1970, Kline was awarded a scholarship to the newly formed Drama Division at the Juilliard School in New York. In 1972, he joined with fellow Juilliard graduates, including Patti LuPone and David Ogden Stiers, and formed the City Center Acting Company (now The Acting Company), under the aegis of John Houseman.

The Company traveled across the U.S. performing Shakespeare's plays, other classical works, and the musical The Robber Bridegroom, founding one of the most widely praised groups in American repertory theatre. At Juilliard, he studied singing with Beverley Peck Johnson.

In 1976, Kline left The Acting Company and settled in New York City, doing a brief appearance as the character "Woody Reed" in the now-defunct soap opera Search for Tomorrow. He followed this with a return to the stage in 1977 to play Clym Yeobright opposite Donna Theodore as Eustacia Vye in The Hudson Guild Theater production of Dance on a Country Grave, Kelly Hamilton's musical version of Thomas Hardy's The Return of the Native. In 1978, he played the role of Bruce Granit, a matinée idol caricature, in Harold Prince's On the Twentieth Century, for which he won his first Tony Award. In 1981, Kline appeared with multi-genre renowned singer Linda Ronstadt and singer Rex Smith in the New York Shakespeare Festival's Central Park production of Gilbert and Sullivan's The Pirates of Penzance, winning another Tony Award for Best Leading Actor in a Musical, for his comically dashing portrayal of the Pirate King. In 1983, he played the role in a film version of the musical, also with Ronstadt, Smith and Angela Lansbury, which had a limited theatrical release.

In the ensuing years, Kline appeared many times in New York Shakespeare Festival productions of Shakespeare plays, including starring roles in Richard III (1983), Much Ado About Nothing (1988), Henry V (1984), and two productions of Hamlet, in 1986 and 1990 (which he also directed). A videotape of the 1990 production has aired on PBS.

He also appeared in a Lincoln Center production that combined the two parts of Henry IV on Broadway at the Vivian Beaumont Theatre in 2003 as Falstaff. Kline was nominated for the 2004 Tony Award, Actor in a Play.

Dubbed "the American Olivier" by New York Times theater critic Frank Rich for his stage acting, Kline finally ventured into film in 1982 in Sophie's Choice. He won the coveted role of the tormented and moody Nathan opposite Meryl Streep. Streep won an Academy Award for her performance in the film. Kline was nominated for a 1983 Golden Globe award (New Star of the Year) and BAFTA Award for Most Outstanding Newcomer To Film.

During the 1980s and early to mid-1990s, Kline made several films with director Lawrence Kasdan, including The Big Chill, Silverado, Grand Canyon, I Love You to Death, and French Kiss. He played Donald Woods in Richard Attenborough's Cry Freedom opposite Denzel Washington about the friendship between activist Stephen Biko and editor Donald Woods.

Newsday critic Lynn Darling wrote on July 13, 1988, that Kline "has proved himself to be one of the most talented and versatile American actors of his generation."

In 1989, Kline won an Academy Award for Best Supporting Actor for his role in the British comedy A Fish Called Wanda, in which he played a painfully inept American ex-CIA thug opposite John Cleese's genteel British barrister and Jamie Lee Curtis' femme fatale/con woman. In 2000, the American Film Institute ranked the film twenty-first on AFI's 100 Years... 100 Laughs. In 1993, he provided his first voice acting role in The Nutcracker. The same year, Kline starred in Dave, a political comedy directed by Ivan Reitman, which also starred Charles Grodin, Sigourney Weaver, and Ben Kingsley.

In 1996, he provided the voice role of Captain Phoebus in the 1996 Disney animated film The Hunchback of Notre Dame.

In 1998, he received a star on the St. Louis Walk of Fame. He was inducted in the American Theatre Hall of Fame in 2003. 

In December 2004, Kline became the 2,272nd recipient of a star on Hollywood Walk of Fame, for his contributions to the motion picture industry, located at 7000 Hollywood Boulevard. 

Kline played the title role in King Lear at the Public Theater and took the lead role in a Broadway production of Cyrano de Bergerac opposite Jennifer Garner. That production was forced to close temporarily after only 11 performances as a result of the Broadway stagehands' strike, but subsequently reopened. Cyrano was filmed in 2008 and aired as part of PBS's Great Performances series in January 2009.

In January 2008, Kline won a Screen Actors Guild award for his portrayal of Jaques in Kenneth Branagh's film As You Like It, adapted from Shakespeare's play. The film premiered theatrically in 2006 in Europe, and was sent straight to HBO in the United States.

Kline's film The Conspirator premiered during the Toronto International Film Festival in 2010 and was described as an "old-fashioned historical thriller". It was well received by most critics. Kline starred in the 2012 comedy Darling Companion alongside Diane Keaton. 

In 2017, Kline returned to Broadway in a revival of the play Present Laughter, for which he received his third Tony Award. The same year, Kline also played Maurice in the musical live-action adaptation of Disney's Beauty and the Beast, directed by Bill Condon and co-starring with Emma Watson and Dan Stevens. The film received positive reviews and grossed $1.2billion worldwide, making it the highest-grossing live-action musical film, the second highest-grossing film of 2017, and the 17th highest-grossing film of all time.

In 2021, it was announced that he would star alongside Cate Blanchett on Alfonso Cuaron's Apple show Disclaimer.

Kline's numerous accolades include Drama Desk Awards, Golden Globe awards, a Gotham Award, a Hasty Pudding Theatricals Man of the Year Award, and a St. Louis International Film Festival Lifetime Achievement Award.

Personal life
Kline met actress Phoebe Cates in 1983. They began dating in 1985 and married in 1989. The couple live on the Upper East Side of Manhattan in New York. They have two children, Owen Joseph Kline (born 1991) and Greta Kline (born 1994), who fronts the band Frankie Cosmos.

After his son, Owen Kline, was diagnosed with juvenile diabetes, Kline became active with the Juvenile Diabetes Research Foundation. In November 2004, he was presented with the JDRF's Humanitarian of the Year award by Meryl Streep for his volunteer efforts on behalf of the organization.

The Kevin Kline Awards honor theatre professionals in St. Louis in an array of categories, which include best actor and actress, set design, choreography, and new play or musical.

Acting credits

Accolades

References

External links

 
 
 
 
 

1947 births
20th-century American male actors
21st-century American male actors
American male film actors
American male Shakespearean actors
American male stage actors
American male television actors
American male musical theatre actors
American male voice actors
American people of Jewish descent
Audiobook narrators
Best Supporting Actor Academy Award winners
Drama Desk Award winners
Indiana University alumni
Juilliard School alumni
Living people
Male actors from St. Louis
Outstanding Performance by a Male Actor in a Miniseries or Television Movie Screen Actors Guild Award winners
People from the Upper East Side
Tony Award winners
Catholics from New York (state)